The 2019–20 Swindon Town F.C. season was the club's 141st season in their existence, and third consecutive in League Two. The season covered the period from 1 July 2019 through to 30 June 2020.

Players

First Team Squad

Transfers

Transfers in

Loans in

Loans out

Transfers out

Non-Playing Staff

Pre-season
On 26 May, The Robins announced their pre-season schedule.

Competitions

League Two

League table

Results summary

Results by matchday

Matches
On Thursday, 20 June 2019, the EFL League Two fixtures were revealed.

FA Cup

The first round draw was made on 21 October 2019.

EFL Cup

The first round draw was made on 20 June.

EFL Trophy

On 9 July 2019, the pre-determined group stage draw was announced with Invited clubs to be drawn on 12 July 2019.

Statistics

Appearances

Top scorers

References

Swindon Town F.C. seasons
Swindon Town